Alcon Bowman (10 May 1862 – 30 June 1938) was an Australian cricketer. He played two first-class cricket matches for Victoria between 1891 and 1892.

See also
 List of Victoria first-class cricketers

References

External links
 

1862 births
1938 deaths
Australian cricketers
Victoria cricketers
Cricketers from Melbourne